Latta High School is a high school located in Ada, Oklahoma. It is the only high school in the Latta School District. 39% of the student body is economically disadvantaged. Latta High placed in the top 5% of Oklahoma high schools for overall test scores.  In 2016, the Oklahoma State Department of Education rated Latta High School as a High-Performing School.

Demographics

References

External links 
 
 

Education in Pontotoc County, Oklahoma
Buildings and structures in Pontotoc County, Oklahoma
Public high schools in Oklahoma